Kuh-e Safed Khers  is a mountain in the Darwaz district of Badakhshan province, Afghanistan.

Resources 

 Wikipamp.<Kuh-e Safed Khers
 Wikipedia Persian.<kuh-e safed khers

Mountains of Afghanistan
International mountains of Asia
Landforms of Badakhshan Province